The Pines is a major sub-regional shopping centre in the southern suburb of Elanora on the Gold Coast, Queensland. The Pines is the only shopping centre on the southern Gold Coast that has all three major supermarkets under its one roof.

Layout
The shopping centre has 97 shops. Kmart, Coles, Woolworths and Aldi are anchor tenants.

Parking and public transport
The Pines is located in the suburb of Elanora, situated on the corner of Guineas Creek Road and KP McGrath Drive, adjacent to the Pacific Motorway.

Parking
The shopping centre has over 1,500 parking spaces available at both undercover and rooftop parking.

Public transport
Surfside Buslines routes serve The Pines going as far north as Robina and south to Tweed Heads.

History
The Pines Shopping Centre was shown at the end of the 1994 movie Muriel's Wedding. It is also shown in several episodes of the TV series Mortified, particularly around the old Woolworths section, which aired from 2006-2007. It is also shown in the 2015 movie San Andreas with filming outside the shopping centre and in the former Dick Smith store. It was renamed Bakersfield Mall for the scene.

2015 redevelopment
The Pines Shopping Centre commenced a $30 million development in January 2015. The development saw a re-located Woolworths, a brand new Aldi along with 15 new specialty stores. The redevelopment was completed in late 2015.

References

Shopping centres on the Gold Coast, Queensland
Shopping malls established in 1987
1987 establishments in Australia